The Boston Museum may refer to:

 Market Museum (Boston), 1804–1822, located in Market Square, Boston Massachusetts, and run by Philip Woods
 Boston Museum (theatre), 1841–1903, former theatre and museum located on Tremont St., Boston, Massachusetts
 Museum of Fine Arts, Boston, established in 1870. Located in Copley Square, 1876–1909. Currently located in the Fenway of Boston, Massachusetts
 The Boston Museum, a project begun in 1998 to create a museum about Boston, Massachusetts